Feeling Sideways is a six-track extended play by Australian indie rock duo, the Mess Hall, released in May 2003. It was co-produced by band members, Anthony Johnsen and Jed Kurzel with Chris Joannou (of Silverchair) and Matt Lovell (Something for Kate) for Cayman Island Mafia/Shock Records. At the ARIA Music Awards of 2003 it was nominated for Best Independent Release. They followed with an Australian tour schedule, "both in support and headlining position."

Track listing

Personnel 

The Mess Hall
 Anthony Johnsen – vocals, drums
 Jed Kurzel – vocals, guitar, harmonica

Additional musicians
 John Gauci – keyboards (track 3)

Recording details
 Producer – Anthony Johnsen, Jed Kurzel, Chris Joannou, Matt Lovell at Milk Bar Studios, Sydney
 Audio engineering – Matt Lovell
 Mastering engineer – Steve Smart at 301 Studios, Sydney
 Cover art – Love Police Action

References

External links
 The Mess Hall 

The Mess Hall albums
2003 EPs
Shock Records EPs